Kenneth Blum (born August 8, 1939) is an American scientist who has studied neuropsychopharmacology and genetics. Until 1995 he was a professor of Pharmacology at the University of Texas Health Science Center at San Antonio.

Blum originated the term "Reward Deficiency Syndrome" (RDS).

Academic background 

Blum received his B.S. in pharmacy from Columbia University in 1961, his M.S. in medical science in 1965 from the New Jersey College of Medicine, and his Ph.D. in pharmacology in 1968 from the New York Medical College. Blum completed post-doctorate research in psychopharmacology at the Southwest Foundation for Research and Education. He also completed a fellowship in pharmacogenetics under Gerald McClearn at the University of Colorado College of Pharmacy (Boulder) in 1977. He retired in 1995 from his position as professor at the Department of Pharmacology, Texas Health Science Center, San Antonio, University of Texas.

Research 
Blum collaborated on a study that found a correlation between an allele in the dopamine D2 Receptor and alcoholism in a post-mortem study of brain tissue from 35 alcoholics and 35 non-alcoholics. Blum believed his work to be of broader scope, calling this gene a "reward gene" which covers other addictive behaviors including drug addiction, smoking, overeating, and pathological gambling.

Reward Deficiency Syndrome 
Blum originated the term "Reward Deficiency Syndrome"(RDS).  "Reward Deficiency Syndrome" has also been featured in over 1,432 peer reviewed publications; the term RDS has been cited in 219 independent articles (47% of which were based on research done at independent laboratories). Blum holds multiple patents relating to genetic testing and treatment for the syndrome that have been licensed through various different corporations. The term has been applied to a wide variety of addictive, obsessive and compulsive behaviors including substance and process addiction and personality and spectrum disorders. The diagnostic validity of RDS while listed and featured as a psychological disorder in a number of medical based dictionaries including Gates and encyclopedia.com and is indeed a featured disorder in SAGE Encyclopedia of Abnormal and Clinical Psychology (pg. 2888). However, RDS has not been recognized by the American Psychiatric Association in its diagnostic manual, the DSM. 

Treatment Based on Reward Deficiency Syndrome

 Precision Addiction Management (PAM): Dopamine homeostasis can be achieved by customizing neuronutrient supplementation based on one's Genetic Addiction Risk score. 
 Goal of treatment: enhance brain reward functional connectivity volume and target reward deficiency and the stress-like anti reward symptomatology of addiction. 
 KB220Z: amino-acid therapy, compounds work in synergy to support brain reward function in the aim to induce dopamine homeostasis and is best described as a Glutaminergic-Dopaminergic Optimization Complex. There are over 30 clinical trials for a number of KB220 variants. There have been numerous positive effects from this treatment for substance users such as: increase in BOLD activation in caudate-accumbens-dopaminergic pathways, sobriety with no relapse two-years post treatment, and reduced cravings. For more information on the positive effects please visit the cited source, which includes positive effects from 29 different studies.

Commercial activities 
Blum is the editor-in-chief of Journal of Reward Deficiency Syndrome and Addiction Science and founded the company that publishes it, United Scientific Group. Blum was also editor-in-chief of OMICS Publication Group's Journal of Addiction Research & Therapy (JART) from 2013 to 2015. Both United Scientific Group and OMICS Group are featured on Beall's list and are widely regarded as predatory open-access publishers.

Blum has received patents for the use of dietary supplements to treat RDS. Blum licenses these patents through his company Synaptamine, Inc., which is incorporated in Austin, Texas. Supplements marketed in this way include Synaptamine, SyntaptaGenX, and Synaptose. Synaptamine has been licensed to LaVita RDS, a company based in Lehi, Utah, of which Blum was the Chief Scientific Officer. Synaptamine was subsequently marketed by Sanus Biotech, a company based in Austin, Texas. SynaptaGenX is licensed to NuPathways Inc., for whom Blum acts as Chief Neuroscience Advisor. Blum has also marketed dietary supplements that claim to assist weight loss, including PhenCal (licensed to Weider Nutrition) and SyntaptaLean (licensed to Nature's Plus). In the past, Blum has sold a variety of supplements and oral sprays through a website called DocBlumInc.

Blum markets a genetic test, the Genetic Addiction Risk Score (GARS), through his company IGENE LLC in partnership with Dominion Diagnostics, through LifeGen, Inc., where he is chairman of the board and Chief Scientific Officer, and via Geneus Health for whom he also acts Chief Scientific Officer and chairman. It is claimed that GARS assesses the genetic predisposition toward RDS.

Until 2008 he was Chief Scientific Officer of Salugen Inc., another direct-to-consumer genetics testing company. After Blum's departure, Salugen continued under the leadership of Brian Meshkin, latterly CEO of Prove Biosciences, until its demise a year later. Blum is Scientific Director of the PATH foundation.

Publications 
Blum, K., Gaskill, H., DeLallo, L., Briggs, A. H., & Hall, W. (1985). Methionine enkephalin as a possible neuromodulator of regional cerebral blood flow. Experientia, 41(7), 932–933. https://doi.org/10.1007/BF01970019

Blum, K., Febo, M., Fried, L., Li, M., Dushaj, K., Braverman, E. R., McLaughlin, T., Steinberg, B., & Badgaiyan, R. D. (2017). Hypothesizing that neuropharmacological and neuroimaging studies of glutaminergic-dopaminergic optimization complex (KB220Z) are associated with “Dopamine Homeostasis” in Reward Deficiency Syndrome (RDS). Substance Use & Misuse, 52(4), 535–547. doi: 10.1080/10826084.2016.1244551
Blum, K., Gondré-Lewis, M. C., Baron, D., Thanos, P. K., Braverman, E. R., Neary, J., Elman, I., & Badgaiyan, R. D. (2018). Introducing precision addiction management of reward deficiency syndrome, the construct that underpins all addictive behaviors. Frontiers in Psychiatry, 9. https://doi.org/10.3389/fpsyt.2018.00548
Blum, K., Febo, M., Mclaughlin, T., Cronjé, F. J., Han, D., & Gold, M. S. (2014). Hatching the behavioral addiction egg: Reward Deficiency Solution System (RDSS)™ as a function of dopaminergic neurogenetics and brain functional connectivity linking all addictions under a common rubric. Journal of Behavioral Addictions, 3(3), 149–156. https://doi.org/10.1556/jba.3.2014.019
Blum, K., Febo, M., Thanos, P. K., Baron, D., Fratantonio, J., & Gold, M. (2015). Clinically combating reward deficiency syndrome (RDS) with dopamine agonist therapy as a paradigm shift: Dopamine for dinner? Molecular Neurobiology, 52(3), 1862–1869.
Blum, K., Chen, A. L. C., Giordano, J., Borsten, J., Chen, T. J. H., Hauser, M., Simpatico, T., Femino, J., Braverman, E. R., & Barh, D. (2012). The addictive brain: All roads lead to dopamine. Journal of Psychoactive Drugs, 44(2), 134–143. https://doi.org/10.1080/02791072.2012.685407

References

External links 
Kenneth Blum's publications on Loop

1939 births
American pharmacologists
Columbia University College of Pharmacy alumni
University of Colorado alumni
Wake Forest University faculty
Living people
Behavior geneticists
American geneticists